The South West Junior A Hurling Championship (known for sponsorship reasons as the RCM Tarmacadam Carbery Junior A Hurling Championship) is an annual hurling competition organised by the Carbery Board of the Gaelic Athletic Association since 1925 for junior hurling teams in the Barony of Carbery in County Cork, Ireland.

The series of games begin in May, with the championship culminating with the final in September. The championship includes a knock-out stage and a "back door" for teams defeated in the first round.

The South West Junior Championship is an integral part of the wider Cork Junior A Hurling Championship. The winners and runners-up of the South West Championship join their counterparts from the other six divisions to contest the county championship.

As of 2020, 11 clubs currently participate in the South West Championship. The title has been won at least once by 13 different clubs. The all-time record-holders are Clonakilty, who have won a total of 17 titles. 

Ballinascarthy are the title-holders after defeating Newcestown by 1-25 to 1-11 in the 2022 final.

Format

Group stage 
The 12 teams are divided into three groups of four. Over the course of the group stage, each team plays once against the others in the group, resulting in each team being guaranteed at least three games. Two points are awarded for a win, one for a draw and zero for a loss. The teams are ranked in the group stage table by points gained, then scoring difference and then their head-to-head record. The top two teams in each group qualify for the knockout stage.

Knockout stage 
Quarter-finals: Two lone quarter-finals featuring the four lowest-placed qualifying teams from the group stage. Two teams qualify for the next round.

Semi-finals: The two quarter-final winners and the top two highest-placed qualifying teams from the group stage contest this round. The two winners from these games advance to the final.

Final: The two semi-final winners contest the final. The winning team are declared champions.

Promotion and relegation 
At the end of the championship, the winning team enters the Cork Junior A Hurling Championship and by winning this, they will be promoted to the Cork Premier Junior Hurling Championship for the following season. There is no relegation to the Carbery Junior B Hurling Championship.

Teams

2023 Teams

Qualification for subsequent competitions

The South West Junior Hurling Championship winners and runners-up qualify for the subsequent Cork Junior A Hurling Championship. Prior to 2017, qualification for the county series was limited to just the championship-winning team.

Trophy

The winning team is presented with the Flyer Nyhan Cup. A native of Clonakilty, John "Flyer" Nyhan (1892-1934) was a member of some excellent Clonakilty teams which contested the county middle grade hurling final in 1912, won the county intermediate football title in 1913 and then won the prestigious South Coast Railway Shields in both football and hurling in 1914. The cup was presented for the first time in 1961.

Roll of honour

List of finals

Notes:
 1928 - An objection by Kilbrittain was upheld and a replay was ordered.
 1940 - The first match ended in a draw: Kilbrittain 2-07, Bandon 3-04.
 1951 - An objection by Courcey Rovers was upheld and they were awarded the title.
 1982 - The first match ended in a draw: Barryroe 2-10, Kilbrittain 3-07.
 1983 - The first match ended in a draw: Clonakilty 1-05, Diarmuid Ó Mathúna's 1-05.
 1990 - The first match ended in a draw: Bandon 1-08, Argideen Rangers 0-11.
 1999 - The first match ended in a draw: Bandon 2-21, Barryroe 6-09.
 2000 - The first match ended in a draw: Ballinascarthy 1-13, Barryroe 2-10.
 2001 - The first match ended in a draw: Diarmuid Ó Mathúna's 0-15, Kilbrittain 2-09.
 2005 - The first match ended in a draw: Diarmuid Ó Mathúna's 0-14, Kilbrittain 3-05.
 2006 - The first match ended in a draw: Barryroe 1-08, Diarmuid Ó Mathúna's 1-08.
 2012 - The match ended in a draw and extra-time was played.

Records

By decade

The most successful team of each decade, judged by number of South West Junior Hurling Championship titles, is as follows:

 1920s: 4 for Kilbrittain (1925-26-27-28)
 1930s: 4 for Bandon (1934-35-36-37)
 1940s: 2 for Clonakilty (1943-44-45-46)
 1950s: 6 for Courcey Rovers (1951-53-54-55-56-57)
 1960s: 4 for Courcey Rovers (1964-65-66-68)
 1970s: 3 for Courcey Rovers (1970-73-74)
 1980s: 4 for Barryroe (1981-82-86-87)
 1990s: 3 for Bandon (1990-95-99)
 2000s: 3 for Diarmuid Ó Mathúna's (2001-02-05-08)
 2010s: 3 for Clonakilty (2012-15-17)

Gaps

Top five longest gaps between successive championship titles:
 50 years: Dohenys (1963-2013)
 36 years: Kilbrittain (1942-1978)
 22 years: Newcestown (1992-2014)
 21 years: Clonakilty (1983-2004)
 19 years: Ballinascarthy (2000-2019)

Winners and finalists

The Double

Five teams have won the South West Junior Hurling Championship and the South West Junior Football Championship in a single year as part of a hurling-Gaelic football double. Kilbrittain became the first team to win the double in 1926. Bandon are the record holders having claimed the double on four occasions - 1929, 1960, 1971 and 1975. Dohenys are the only club to have won a back-to-back double - 1958 and 1959. Newcestown (1967) and Clonakilty (1977) complete the list of double-winning teams.

Club sides Argideen Rangers, Ballinascarthy and O'Donovan Rossa also hold the distinction of being dual divisional junior championship-winning teams, however, these were not achieved in a single calendar season.

2022 Championship

Group stage 
Group 1

Group 2

Group 3

Knockout stage

See also
South West Junior A Football Championship

References

External link

 Carbery GAA website

South West Junior A Hurling eirChampionship